Coleman is an unincorporated community in Columbiana County, Ohio

History
A train station called Coleman was established in 1890. Coleman was settled by coal miners during the oil and coal boom of the 1890s. There was a hotel, a store and some houses which were all abandoned by 1930.

References 

Unincorporated communities in Columbiana County, Ohio